The Fokker D.XVI (sometimes written as Fokker D.16) was a sesquiplane fighter aircraft developed in the Netherlands in the late 1920s.

Development
The Fokker D.XVI was a conventional, single-bay sesquiplane with staggered wings braced with V-struts. It featured an open cockpit and fixed undercarriage with a tailskid. The wings were made up of wood spars and ribs with a plywood covering, while the fuselage was of steel tube construction with a fabric covering. Power was provided by an Armstrong Siddeley Jaguar radial engine fitted with a Townend ring.

Operational history
The Royal Netherlands Army ordered 14 aircraft, which differed from the prototype in having divided main undercarriage units in place of the prototype's cross-axle. 
Hungary purchased four aircraft with Gnome et Rhône-built Bristol Jupiter engines in place of the Armstrong Siddeley Jaguar engines used on the Dutch machines. 
Evaluation aircraft were also provided to China, Italy, Roumania and the Royal Netherlands East Indies Army. 
The Royal Netherlands East Indies Army machine was powered by a Curtiss V-1570, which crashed in March 1931 at Schiphol. 
The D.XVI also won a competition organised by the government of Roumania to select a new fighter, but despite this, no orders were placed. One Dutch Army aircraft was given to Roumania.
In lieu of the radial-engined D.XVI, Fokker manufactured the similar Fokker D.XVII powered with an inline engine. 
One example was fitted with a three-bladed propeller and a full-chord NACA cowling.

Operators

 Republic of China Air Force (RoCAF) - evaluation only

 Royal Hungarian Air Force - two aircraft

 Regia Aeronautica - evaluation only

 Royal Netherlands Air Force
 Royal Netherlands East Indies Army - evaluation only

 Royal Romanian Air Force - evaluation only

Specifications

References

Citations

Bibliography
 
 
 

1920s Dutch fighter aircraft
D 16
Sesquiplanes
Aircraft first flown in 1929